Dale Vince  (born 29 August 1961) is a British "green energy" industrialist. A former New Age traveller, he is the owner of the electricity company Ecotricity.

Early life and career
Vince was born in Great Yarmouth, Norfolk. Leaving school at 15, he spent time as a New Age traveller.

In 1991, he saw his first windfarm ("I thought, either I can carry on by myself with the windmill on my van, or I can get into the big stuff") and in 1995 he founded the Renewable Energy Company. In 1996, he launched his first wind turbine supplying "green electricity".

In October 2020 The Guardian reported that he plans to create artificial diamonds by chemical vapor deposition using "carbon dioxide captured directly from the atmosphere to form the diamonds – which are chemically identical to diamonds mined from the earth – using wind and solar electricity, with water collected from rainfall."

In April 2022, Vince announced he planned to sell Ecotricity and go into politics.  He said part of the reason was that a new owner "can achieve even more, faster. We’ve got a massive pipeline of projects that need to be built requiring £2 billion of investment." As well as developing his interest in politics, he would focus on renewable projects such as tidal lagoons and geothermal energy.

Football
In 2010 Vince became a major shareholder of Forest Green Rovers FC, and three months later was appointed club chairman. In February 2011, Rovers players were banned from eating red meat for health reasons, and a few weeks later the sale of all meat products was banned at the club's ground, leaving only vegetarian options and free-range poultry and fish from sustainable stocks.

Vince has also introduced a number of different eco-friendly developments at the club including the installation of solar panels on its New Lawn home ground, the use of a solar-powered robot grass mower, and the creation of the world's first organic football pitch. In September 2015, Vince revealed Forest Green were using a player recruitment method similar to the 'Moneyball' model that had been initially used in baseball to sign players by using computer-generated analysis. In October 2015, Forest Green became the world's first all vegan football club.

In 2021, the team became the first in the world to play in a football kit made from a composite material consisting of recycled plastic and coffee grounds. 

The United Nations has recognised Forest Green Rovers as the world's first carbon-neutral football club and it was described by FIFA as the “greenest team in the world”.

Honours
Vince was appointed an Officer of the Order of the British Empire (OBE) in the 2004 New Year Honours for "services to the Environment and to the Electricity Industry".

In 2013, he was given the honorary degree of Doctor of Philosophy by the University of Gloucestershire.

Personal life
He is a vegan.

While studying, Vince met and married Kathleen Wyatt in 1981. The couple subsequently became New Age travellers together, and had a son in 1983. They separated some years later, and Wyatt subsequently raised the couple's son alone. They divorced in 1992.

Divorce and financial claim court case
After Vince had made his fortune, Wyatt, who had lived what was later described in court as "16 years of real hardship", lodged a financial claim of £1.9 million against Vince in 2011, nearly 20 years after their divorce.

The Court of Appeal rejected the claim, stating it had "no real prospect of success" and was an "abuse of process". However, in March 2015 the Supreme Court set aside this decision, ruling that there was no time limit in law for claims for financial provision, and the claim could progress in the High Court. Lord Wilson said the court must have regard "to the contribution of each party to the welfare of the family, including by looking after the home or caring for the family", but the claim only had a prospect of "comparatively modest success" with a £1.9 million payout "out of the question".

In a statement, Vince branded the court's decision "mad": "I feel that we all have a right to move on, and not be looking over our shoulders. This could signal open season for people who had brief relationships a quarter of a century ago."

Prior to the case settlement, Vince paid the legal costs for both parties, of over £500,000, as divorce law permits costs to be charged to the combined resources of both parties.

In 2016, the case was settled when Vince agreed to pay £300,000 to Wyatt. He commented that the case had been "a terrible waste of time and money" and the settlement barely covered Wyatt’s legal fees. He then repeated his opinion that he was "...disappointed that the supreme court decided not to throw out the case, given it was brought over 30 years since the relationship ended" before adding, "There clearly needs to be a statute of limitations for divorce cases – a time limit beyond which a claim cannot be made. Such a thing exists in commercial law for good practical reasons."

Politics
Vince has made donations to both the Labour Party and the Green Party.

Prior to the 2015 UK general election, he was one of several celebrities who endorsed the parliamentary candidacy of the Green Party's Caroline Lucas.

He endorsed the Labour Party in the 2019 general election. 

He has also stated that he has made donations to various Labour Party MPs, as well as environmental protest groups, such as Just Stop Oil, Extinction Rebellion, Greenpeace and Sea Shepherd.

References

1961 births
British chief executives in the energy industry
English businesspeople
English football chairmen and investors
Forest Green Rovers F.C.
Green Party of England and Wales people
Labour Party (UK) people
Living people
Officers of the Order of the British Empire
People associated with the University of Gloucestershire
People associated with wind power
People from Great Yarmouth